Son, is a Turkish psychological thriller series produced by Ay Yapım, broadcast on ATV and directed by Ezel's director Uluç Bayraktar. Starring actors are Yiğit Özşener, Nehir Erdoğan, Erkan Can, Berrak Tüzünataç, and Engin Altan Düzyatan.

The series has been sold to 20th Century Fox Television in the United States and was adapted into a pilot named Runner for ABC. No series has been ordered from this pilot, Also the rights to produce local versions of the series have been sold in Russia, Spain and France. In the Netherlands, the remake Flight HS13 was released in 2018.

International broadcasts

References 

Turkish drama television series
2012 Turkish television series debuts
2012 Turkish television series endings
Television series by Ay Yapım
ATV (Turkey) original programming
Nonlinear narrative television series
Television shows set in Istanbul
Television series produced in Istanbul
Television series set in the 2010s